Signe or Signy is a feminine given name. It may also refer to:

 459 Signe, an asteroid
 René-Pierre Signé (born 1930), French politician
 "Le Signe" ("The Signal"), a short story by Guy de Maupassant
 "Signe", an Eric Clapton instrumental piece on the album Unplugged
 Signy Island, South Orkney Islands, Antarctica